Enrico Gandola (born 11 June 1967) is an Italian lightweight rower. He won gold medals at the 1987 World Rowing Championships in Copenhagen with the lightweight men's double scull (Calabrese-Gandola), and at the 1988 World Rowing Championships in Milan with the lightweight men's double scull (Gandola Esposito).

He is a former president of the Italian Rowing Federation (2008–2012).

References

1967 births
Living people
Italian male rowers
World Rowing Championships medalists for Italy